Connell McShane (born August 4, 1977) is an American broadcaster, reporter and play-by-play commentator. He is currently the chief national correspondent for Fox Business. McShane previously anchored or hosted a number of programs, including Imus in the Morning, Fox Business Morning, and After the Bell.

 Early life 
Connell McShane was born and raised on Long Island, New York. His father grew up in Kilcar, County Donegal, Ireland. He attended Fordham University where he graduated with a bachelor's degree in communication and media studies in 1999.

 Career 
 1997–1999: Sports commentating 
While studying at Fordham, he began working in sports reporting and was a sports broadcaster at WFUV from 1997 to 1999. In 1998, he interned for the Yankees Radio Network. He was also a play-by-play commentator for WBRK, where he broadcast games for the Pittsfield Mets.

 1999–2007: Bloomberg Radio, Bloomberg Television 
After graduating from Fordham, McShane originally planned to become a sports commentator. However, in 1999 he became a desk assistant at Bloomberg Radio. This led to him becoming a local news reporter in New York City in 2000. One of his first major assignments as a reporter was covering the September 11 attacks for WBBR. While at Bloomberg Radio, McShane eventually transitioned into a role as a business reporter, reporting live from Nasdaq and the New York Stock Exchange. He was picked to co-anchor the syndicated morning show The First Word with Peter Schacknow. He later began working for Bloomberg Television, where he anchored On the Markets, Evening Edition, and Marketweek. 2007–present: Fox Business Network, Imus in the Morning 
McShane joined Fox Business as a business reporter when it launched in 2007. He was then promoted to anchoring the network’s early morning program in 2008 alongside Jenna Lee. He became one of the business reporters for Don Imus' Imus in the Morning after Fox began simulcasting the program in 2009. McShane also filled in on one occasion for Charles McCord, who missed one of Imus in the Morning remote broadcasts due to illness. Beginning on May 9, 2011, McShane was news anchor on the show, a position he held until 2017. In 2010, McShane began co-hosting the 11am program Markets Now on Fox Business Network alongside Dagen McDowell. He was also a radio play-by-play broadcaster for ESPN's coverage of the 2013 Pinstripe Bowl.

McShane co-anchored After the Bell'' with Melissa Francis from 2018 to 2021. During the show, McShane reported live from swing states during the 2020 US presidential election.

Personal life 
McShane married his wife Renee in 1999. They have three children.

Filmography

References

External links 

Living people
WFUV people
Fox Business people
Fox News people
New York (state) television reporters
Fordham University alumni
1977 births